Traduire is a 2011 French independent underground experimental documentary art film directed by Nurith Aviv.

Synopsis
The film, the third in a trilogy, containing Misafa Lesafa (2004) and Langue sacrée, langue parlée (2008), contains conversations with translators of Hebrew works into different languages. Among the interviewees are Brest, France-based Sandrick Le Mague, who translates theological texts into French, Boston-based professor Angel Sáenz-Badillos, who translates medieval poetry into Spanish, Acre-based Israeli-Arab novelist, screenwriter, and, journalist, Ala Hlehel, who translates the plays of Israeli playwright Hanoch Levin into Arabic, Malakoff-based professor , who compiles a Hebrew-Yiddish dictionary, Barcelona-based professor , who translates the contemporary Israeli poet Yehuda Amichai into Catalan, Tel Aviv-based Israeli poet, Sivan Beskin, who translates the contemporary Israeli poet Leah Goldberg into Russian and Lithuanian, and, Berkeley, California-based professor Chana Bloch, who translated into English the works of contemporary Israeli poets Yehuda Amichai and Dahlia Ravikovitch.

Reception
Critic Jacques Mandelbaum opined that "Aviv films these encounters carefully, taking time to listen to each translator in the half-light of their offices, bringing surprisingly passionate ideas to the surface" and that the film "finds room in its erudite enterprise to explore sensibilities."

References

External links
Traduire at Nurith Aviv's Official Website 

2010s avant-garde and experimental films
2011 documentary films
2011 independent films
2011 films
2010s Arabic-language films
Catalan-language films
Documentary films about education
Documentary films about Israel
Documentary films about Italy
Documentary films about journalists
Documentary films about Paris
Documentary films about playwrights
Documentary films about poets
Documentary films about Spain
Documentary films about the United States
Documentary films about women
Documentary films about words and language
2010s English-language films
Films about educators
Films about screenwriters
Films directed by Nurith Aviv
Films set in Barcelona
Films set in Boston
Films set in California
Films set in Jerusalem
Films set in Milan
Films set in Tel Aviv
Films shot in Barcelona
Films shot in California
Films shot in Israel
Films shot in Massachusetts
Films shot in Milan
French avant-garde and experimental films
French documentary films
French independent films
2010s French-language films
2010s German-language films
2010s Hebrew-language films
2010s Italian-language films
2010s Russian-language films
2010s Spanish-language films
Yiddish-language films
2011 multilingual films
French multilingual films
2010s French films